Brighton, Nova Scotia  is a  community of the Municipality of the District of Shelburne in the Canadian province of Nova Scotia. It is located near the town of Lockeport.

References
Brighton on Destination Nova Scotia

Communities in Shelburne County, Nova Scotia
General Service Areas in Nova Scotia